Kana Kanmani is a 2009 family horror film by Akku Akbar starring Jayaram and Padmapriya. The film is a remake of the director's previous Hindi film Gauri: The Unborn.

Plot
Roy is a successful architect married to Maya with a daughter named Anakha(pet name Anu). Roy decides to take his family on a vacation to Singapore, but Anu insists that they first go to Roy's old home. They agree to go there first, stay for 4 days, and then go to Singapore.

But upon arriving at the old house, Anu starts behaving strangely and soon Roy and Maya understand that she is possessed by the ghost of their unborn child Shivani, who was aborted. It was at this house both that Maya conceived Shivani and that they decided to abort the pregnancy. Shivani tells them that she is envious of the love that Roy and Maya are giving Anu, and that she will kill Anu as revenge. Roy and Maya try to escape in vain. Roy calls his friend Rajeevan to his house. They all anxiously pray and wait until the time when Shivani said she would kill Anu. By that time, Shivani has changed her mind, after seeing the parents' love for Anu, and spares her life.

The movie ends with Roy and Maya accepting Shivani's presence in their world and giving her space.

Cast

Soundtrack
The music was composed by Shyam Dharman, with lyrics written by Sarath Vayalar.

References

External links
 

2000s Malayalam-language films
2009 horror films
2000s horror drama films
Malayalam remakes of Hindi films
2009 films
Indian horror drama films
Indian horror film remakes
Films directed by Akku Akbar
2009 drama films